Patrick Elvin Fleagle (born March 22, 1951) is a former Republican member of the Pennsylvania House of Representatives. He represented the 90th legislative district from 1989  until 2006.

Fleagle graduated from Waynesboro Area Senior High School in 1969 and from Juniata College in 1973.

Fleagle's opponent in the 2006 Republican primary, Todd Rock, entered the race because of Fleagle's support for the 2005 legislative pay raise. Rock defeated Fleagle by 111 votes in the primary. Fleagle was able to get on the ballot by defeating Rock 339-336 as a write-in for the Democratic ballot, setting up a rematch of the two rivals in the fall.  In the general election, Rock defeated Fleagle with 54% of the vote.

Electoral history

References

External links
 official PA House website

Living people
Republican Party members of the Pennsylvania House of Representatives
People from Waynesboro, Pennsylvania
1951 births